Isaac Thomas Kottukapally (1948/9 – 18 February 2021) was an Indian film score composer, music director and script writer working mainly in Malayalam, Kannada and Hindi films. He scored music for several English documentaries and commercials.

Isaac debuted as a composer into the film industry with the National award winning Kannada film Thaayi Saheba (1997) directed by Girish Kasaravalli. For his background score in the film Adaminte Makan Abu (2010), Isaac won the Best Music Director award at the 58th National Film Awards. Besides this, he won the Kerala State Film Awards five times for his score in various Malayalam films.

Early life 
Isaac was the son of former Member of Parliament George Thomas Kottukapally and was a member of the Kottukapally family of  Pala, Kerala. His childhood activities were predominantly into arts and music. He did his schooling at the Bishop Cotton Boys' School. At home in Pala, he was exposed to an extensive collection of music and literature. His fascination with the works of composers like C. Ramachandra, Bombay Ravi, Madan Mohan and S. D. Burman pushed him towards music composition. He was interested in ballets and operas and also began to write scripts. 
While doing his graduation at the Madras Christian College, he decided to enroll himself at the Film and Television Institute of India (FTII) at Pune. He obtained his postgraduate diploma in Film direction and screenplay writing. Subsequently, he began to assist G. Aravindan for films like Thampu (1978), Kummatty (1979) and Esthappan (1980).

Career
Isaac entered into film composing with the Kannada film Thaayi Saheba released in 1997. The film was received well by the critics and the music was appreciated. This paved the way for a long association of Isaac with the director Girish Kasaravalli. He went on to score Kasaravalli's future films such as Kraurya (1996), Dweepa (2002), Naayi Neralu (2006) and Gulabi Talkies (2008).

In Malayalam, he composed for many films such as Margam, Sancharram, Kutty Srank, Punyam Aham and Adaminte Makan Abu and many others which won him Kerala State Awards and National film award. His score for the 1:1.6 An Ode to Lost Love (2004) was also appreciated at the Panorama at the International Film Festival of India.

Discography

Awards and nominations

References

External links 
 
 Many landmarks to his credit

1940s births
Year of birth uncertain
Date of birth missing
2021 deaths
Film musicians from Kerala
People from Pala, Kerala
Indian male songwriters
Kannada film score composers
Malayalam film score composers
Kerala State Film Award winners
Best Background Score National Film Award winners
Indian male screenwriters
Hindi film score composers
Madras Christian College alumni
Film and Television Institute of India alumni
20th-century Indian musicians
Male film score composers
20th-century male musicians